Zilje is a settlement above the left bank of the Kolpa River in the Municipality of Črnomelj in the White Carniola area of southeastern Slovenia. The area is part of the traditional region of Lower Carniola and is now included in the Southeast Slovenia Statistical Region.

Geography
Zilje has three settlement centers: Gornje Zilje (literally, 'upper Zilje') to the west with a smaller hamlet called Majišče, Srednje Zilje (literally, 'middle Zilje') east of that, also known as Cvetaše, and Spodnje Zilje (literally, 'lower Zilje') furthest east. A road from Vinica to Preloka runs through the village. The fields have sinkholes, and above them are  sparse birch and fern woods, low-quality hay fields mowed once a year, and then mixed woods in the direction of Bojanci. The village lies on the sheltered lee of a hill, favorable for orchards and vineyards.

Name
Zilje was recorded in written sources in 1674 as Dorff Sylle. The name is believed to derive from the same root as Slovene Zilja 'Gail Valley' (in Austria), probably from a pre-Romance substrate form such as *gai̯li̯a- meaning 'foaming, powerful' and referring to the nearby river.

Church
The local church is dedicated to Saint Anthony of Padua and belongs to the Parish of Preloka. It was first mentioned in written documents dating to 1526, but owes its current Baroque look to a remodelling in the 18th century. In 1888 it also underwent a major rebuilding. The main altar dates to the late 19th century.

References

External links
Zilje on Geopedia
On the map of Dolnje Zilje, the route of the wire around the fortified buildings during the Second World War is marked
Frančiška Tahija remembers his childhood years during the Second World War (video with English subtitles).
 Zilje at the Crossroads of War Presentation of some events in Zilje during World War II.

Populated places in the Municipality of Črnomelj